Scott Fraser McKenna (born 12 November 1996) is a Scottish professional footballer, who plays as a defender for Premier League club Nottingham Forest and the Scotland national team.

Club career

Aberdeen
McKenna began his career in the Aberdeen academy and was initially a left back before moving to the centre. The Daily Record called him "one of the most promising defenders in the country".

McKenna made his professional debut for Aberdeen as a substitute against St Johnstone on 6 February 2016. His first start came against Heart of Midlothian on 16 May 2016. On 22 May 2016, he signed a new two-year contract with Aberdeen, In November 2016, McKenna moved on loan to Scottish Championship side Ayr United for 28 days, his second time on loan with the club. His loan was subsequently extended until the end of the season.

In October 2017, McKenna extended his Aberdeen contract until 2021. The club rejected a bid from Hull City to buy him in January 2018. In January 2018, McKenna scored from more than 35 yards in Aberdeen's 3–1 win against Kilmarnock. He claimed in an interview after the match that Kilmarnock skipper Kris Boyd urged him to "shoot" so he obliged. On 7 March 2018, McKenna signed a new contract extension until 2023.

Aberdeen rejected an offer of £3.5 million for McKenna from Celtic in August 2018. Later in August, Aberdeen rejected a larger offer from Aston Villa. During the summer 2019 transfer window, Aberdeen rejected offers from Queens Park Rangers and Nottingham Forest for McKenna after he handed in a transfer request.

In December 2019 Aberdeen chairman Dave Cormack confirmed the club had received no offers or approaches from other clubs for McKenna or teammate Sam Cosgrove. McKenna suffered a torn hamstring during a Scottish Cup tie at St Mirren on 29 February 2020.

In August 2020 he was one of eight Aberdeen players who received a suspended three-match ban from the Scottish FA after they breached restrictions relating to the COVID-19 pandemic by visiting a bar earlier in the month. Aberdeen entered transfer negotiations with Nottingham Forest regarding McKenna in September 2020, which meant that he was left out of the Aberdeen team for a match with Motherwell.

Nottingham Forest
On 23 September 2020, McKenna moved to EFL Championship side Nottingham Forest for an undisclosed fee. The fee was confirmed by Aberdeen as a "club-record fee" reported as a £3 million fee that could rise to £6 million. He made his Forest debut on 25 September 2020 in a 1–0 defeat to Huddersfield Town. He scored his first goal for the club in a 2–1 win over Coventry City on 4 November 2020. He was crowned as Forest's Player of the Season for their promotion winning 2021–22 campaign.

International career
McKenna captained the Scotland under-19s in a 2–2 draw with the Czech Republic in 2014. McKenna made his first appearance for the Scotland under-21s in September 2017.

McKenna was selected for the full national squad in March 2018, and made his full international debut in a 1–0 defeat against Costa Rica on 23 March. In his fourth game for Scotland, a 1–0 defeat to Mexico on 2 June 2018, McKenna was made team captain. On 11 October 2018, McKenna came on a second-half substitute in a 2–1 defeat against Israel, marking his competitive debut for Scotland.

Personal life
A pupil at Webster's High School in Kirriemuir, McKenna supported Celtic as a boy. He is distantly related to the late Alan Gilzean, who was a cousin of McKenna's maternal grandmother. His father Ian played semi-professionally in the Scottish Football League for Forfar Athletic and Montrose in the 1990s.

Career statistics

Club

International

Honours
Nottingham Forest
EFL Championship play-offs: 2022

Individual
Nottingham Forest Player of the Season 2021–22

See also
List of Scotland national football team captains

References

External links
Profile at the Nottingham Forest F.C. website

1996 births
Living people
People from Kirriemuir
Footballers from Angus, Scotland
Scottish footballers
Aberdeen F.C. players
Ayr United F.C. players
Alloa Athletic F.C. players
Nottingham Forest F.C. players
Association football central defenders
Scottish Professional Football League players
English Football League players
Premier League players
Scotland youth international footballers
Scotland under-21 international footballers
Scotland international footballers
UEFA Euro 2020 players